Kandra may refer to:

Kandra, a census town in Saraikela Kharsawan district, Jharkhand, considered as an integral part of the Jamshedpur Metropolitan Region
Kandra, Bardhaman, a village in Ketugram I CD Block in Katwa subdivision,  Bardhaman district, West Bengal